Local Government Division is a Bangladesh government is a government division under the Ministry of Local Government, Rural Development and Co-operatives responsible for the development and supporting local government bodies. Helal Uddin Ahmed is the secretary in charge of division.

History
In 2006, Transparency International Bangladesh stated in a report that the Local Government Division and Ministry of Local Government, Rural Development and Co-operatives was the most corrupt in Bangladesh. The report stated that more than 2 billion taka were misappropriated in the ministry. M Zahirul Islam, Secretary of the Local Government Division rejected the report and said that the Minister of Local Government, Rural Development and Co-operatives, Abdul Mannan Bhuiyan, was a honest individual.

Local Government Division is the lead agency in Local Government Initiatives on Climate change, a project of the United Nations Development Programme and in partnership with United Nations Capital Development Fund, the European Union, and Swedish International Development Cooperation Agency. The initiative plans to enhance capacity and climate resilience of about 200,000 of the most vulnerable households in Bangladesh.

In 2020, during cyclone Amphan the Local Government Division established a control room to coordinate response to the cyclone. During the COVID-19 pandemic in Bangladesh, the Local Government Division suspended 89 elected local public representatives, including Union Parisad chairmen, union members, and municipal councilors, for embezzling relief materials for the outbreak. From 2012 to 2020, the Local Government Division received the largest share of the budget allotment.

Local government bodies
The following are local government bodies under the Local Government Division
Union Council
Zila Parishad (District Council)
Upazila Parishad
City Corporations of Bangladesh
Pourashava (Municipal Corporations of Bangladesh)
Water Supply and Sewerage Authority

References

1972 establishments in Bangladesh
Organisations based in Dhaka
Government departments of Bangladesh